Ray L. Birdwhistell (September 29, 1918 – October 19, 1994) was an American anthropologist who founded kinesics as a field of inquiry and research.  Birdwhistell coined the term kinesics, meaning "facial expression, gestures, posture and gait, and visible arm and body movements". He estimated that "no more than 30 to 35 percent of the social meaning of a conversation or an interaction is carried by the words." Stated more broadly, he argued that "words are not the only containers of social knowledge." He proposed other technical terms, including kineme, and many others less frequently used today. Kendon, Harris and Key (1975), Kendon (1977), Sarles (1977), Wolfgang (1979), and Davis (1982).

Birdwhistell's students include:
University of Toronto: Erving Goffman
Eastern Pennsylvania Psychiatric Institute: Paul Byers, Alan Lomax
University of Pennsylvania: Lorraine V. Aragon, Maria Catedra, Mary Moore Goodlett, Jane Jorgenson, Wendy Leeds-Hurwitz, Barbara A. Lynch, Christopher Musello, Stuart J. Sigman, Yves Winkin, James Veihdeffer

Goffman became one of the best-known sociologists with an international reputation, and nearly all of his publications became best sellers. Birdwhistell influenced Lomax's development of cantometrics and choreometrics. Byers was quite important in the study of visual communication. Winkin went on to develop the anthropology of communication in Europe. Leeds-Hurwitz and Sigman developed social communication theory, Jorgenson studies family communication, and Musello studies material culture. What is important about this list is the wide variety - those who never studied with Birdwhistell often assume that kinesics was the start and end of his interests, but that was not at all the case.

Birdwhistell's first book Introduction to Kinesics, was published in 1952, but as this was essentially an internal publication for the Department of State, his second book, Kinesics and Context has been cited far more often, and, along with a brief encyclopedia article on kinesics, has had far greater influence on the study of communication behavior. Many of Birdwhistell's publications were short pieces, gathered together to make up Kinesics and Context.

Birdwhistell viewed communication as a continuous, multichannel (today, the more common term is multimodal) process through which and in which social interaction occurs. Although he is best known for inventing kinesics, his influence was much larger: he helped establish the logical underpinnings of language and social interaction research generally, and such approaches as the coordinated management of meaning.

Publications
Books
Birdwhistell, R. L. (1952). Introduction to Kinesics: An Annotation System for Analysis of Body Motion and Gesture. Washington, DC: Department of State, Foreign Service Institute.
Birdwhistell, R. L. (1970). Kinesics and Context: Essays on Body Motion Communication. Philadelphia: University of Pennsylvania Press.

Shorter publications (partial)
 Birdwhistell, R. L. (1956). Kinesic analysis of filmed behavior of children. In B. Schaffner (Ed.), Group Processes: Transactions of the second conference (pp. 141–144). New York: Josiah Macy, Jr. Foundation.
 Birdwhistell, R. L. (1959). Contribution of Linguistic-Kinesic Studies for the Understanding of Schizophrenia. In A. Auerback (Ed.), Schizophrenia (pp. 99–123). New York: Ronald Press.
 Birdwhistell, R, L. (1960). Implications of Recent Developments in Communication Research for Evolutionary Theory. In W. M. Austin (Ed.), Report of the Ninth Annual Round Table Meeting on Linguistics and Language Study (pp. 149–155). Washington, D.C.: Georgetown University Press.
 Birdwhistell, R. L. (1961). Paralanguage 25 Years After Sapir. In H. W. Brosin (Ed.), Lectures on Experimental Psychiatry (pp. 43–63). Pittsburgh: University of Pittsburgh Press.
 
 Birdwhistell, R. L. (1962). Critical Moments in the Psychiatric Interview. In T. T. Tourlentes (Ed.), Research Approaches to a Psychiatric Problem (pp. 179–188). New York: Grune and Stratton.
 
 
 
 Birdwhistell, R. L. (1971). Kinesics: Inter- and Intra-channel communication research. In J. Kristeva, J. Rey-Debove & D. J. Umiker (Eds.), Essays in semiotics/Essais de semiotique (pp. 527–546). The Hague: Mouton.
 Birdwhistell, R. L. (1971). Chapter 3: Body Motion, In N. A. McQuown (Ed.), The Natural History of an Interview (pp. 1–93). Microfilm Collection of Manuscripts on Cultural Anthropology, Fifteenth Series, Chicago: University of Chicago, Joseph Regenstein Library, Department of Photoduplication.
 Birdwhistell, R. L. (1971). Appendix 6: Sample Kinesic Transcription. In N. A. McQuown (Ed.), The Natural History of an Interview (pp. 1–29). Microfilm Collection of Manuscripts on Cultural Anthropology, Fifteenth Series. Chicago: University of Chicago, Joseph Regenstein Library, Department of Photoduplication.
 Birdwhistell, R. L. (1974). The language of the body: The natural environment of words. In A. Silverstein (Ed.), Human communication (pp. 203–220). Hillsdale, NJ: Lawrence Erlbaum.
 Birdwhistell, R. L. (1975). Background considerations of the study of the body as a medium of 'expression.' In J. Benthall & T. Polhemus (Eds.), The body as a medium of expression (pp. 34–58). New York: E. P. Dutton. 
 Birdwhistell, R. L. (1977). Some Discussion of Ethnography, Theory, and Method, In J. Brockman (Ed.), About Bateson (pp. 101–141). New York: E. P. Dunon.
 Birdwhistell, R. L., C. F. Hockett, & N. A. McQuown. (1971). Chapter 6: Transcript, Transcription and Commentary. In N. A. McQuown (Ed,), The Natural History of an Interview [n,p,]. Microfilm Collection of Manuscripts on Cultural Anthropology, Fifteenth Series, Chicago: University of Chicago, Joseph Regenstein Library. Department of Photoduplication.
Interviews and lectures

 Gross, T. (1979) Dr. Birdwhistell’s Body Language. Fresh Air with Terry Gross, WHYY, Philadelphia, 29 June 1979. https://freshairarchive.org/segments/dr-birdwhistells-body-language
 McDermott, R. (1980). Profile: Ray L. Birdwhistell. The Kinesis Report. 2 (3): 1-4, 14-16.
 Talese, G. (2010.) Dr. Birdwhistell and the Athletes. In Michael Rosenwald (Ed.), The Silent Season of a Hero: The Sports Writing of Gay Talese (pp. 186–200). New York: Walker & Co.
 Watter, S. B. (2021). Ray L. Birdwhistell, “Lecture at American Museum of Natural History, October 4, 1980." In J. McElvenny & A. Ploder (Eds.), Holisms of Communication: The Early History of Audio-Visual Sequence Analysis (pp. 249–263). Berlin: Language Science Press. doi:10.5281/zenodo.5142265.

See also
Macy Conferences
Kinesics

References

1918 births
1994 deaths
Miami University alumni
Ohio State University Graduate School alumni
People from Brigantine, New Jersey
University of Chicago alumni
University of Louisville faculty
Temple University faculty
University of Pennsylvania faculty
20th-century American anthropologists